Frant railway station is on the Hastings line in East Sussex, England, and serves the civil parish of Frant (although the station is actually located some  from the village of that name, in the hamlet of Bells Yew Green). It is  down the line from London Charing Cross. The station and all trains serving it are operated by Southeastern.

History 

The station was opened by the South Eastern Railway (SER) at the same time as the route, in 1851, and the original station building, which is situated on the Down (eastern) side of the line, remains in use. Designed by the company's architect, William Tress, and built of local ragstone in a Gothic lodge style, with a canopy added in 1905, it has been a Grade II listed building since 1982. The platforms are staggered: a common arrangement at early SER stations which allowed passengers to cross the line in relative safety behind two trains stopped at the station, although today the platforms are connected by a footbridge. From the 1960s until 1986, the station was served only at peak times on week days. However, since 1986, when the line was electrified, it has been served seven days a week.

Services 
All services at Frant are operated by Southeastern using  EMUs.

The typical off-peak service in trains per hour is:
 1 tph to London Charing Cross via 
 1 tph to 

During the peak hours, the station is served by additional services between London Charing Cross and Hastings, increasing the service to 2 tph in each direction.

References

External links 

 Historic Railway Buildings of South East England
Sussex Industrial Archaeology Society

Railway stations in East Sussex
DfT Category E stations
Former South Eastern Railway (UK) stations
Railway stations in Great Britain opened in 1851
Railway stations served by Southeastern
1851 establishments in England
railway station